The 1995 LPGA Championship was the 41st LPGA Championship, played May 11–14 at DuPont Country Club in Wilmington, Delaware.

Kelly Robbins won her only major title, one stroke ahead of defending champion Laura Davies. Robbins had led after each of the first two rounds, but fell a stroke behind leader Davies after 54 holes. In a cool rain on Sunday, Robbins birdied three of the final seven holes to pass Davies for the win.

This was the second of eleven consecutive LPGA Championships at DuPont Country Club. It was the richest major on tour from 1990 through this year, passed by the U.S. Women's Open in 1996.

Past champions in the field

Source:

Final leaderboard
Sunday, May 14, 1995

Source:

References

External links
Golf Observer leaderboard

Women's PGA Championship
Golf in Delaware
LPGA Championship
LPGA Championship
LPGA Championship
LPGA Championship
Women's sports in Delaware